Classique may refer to:

 Classique (fragrance), a women's fragrance created by Jacques Cavallier for Jean-Paul Gaultier in 1993
 ATMA Classique, a Canadian record label
 Canadian Classique, a soccer rivalry between Toronto FC and the Montreal Impact
 Le Classique, a football match contested between French clubs Paris Saint-Germain and Olympique de Marseille
 Musique classique, a French television channel
 Orchestrette Classique, an American female chamber orchestra in New York
 Radio Classique, a French classical music radio station